Aislinn "Ace" Konig is a Canadian-Austrian professional basketball player for the Flammes Carolo Basket of the Ligue Féminine de Basketball and the Canada women's national basketball team. A switch-up guard and a reliable, consistent three-point shooter, Konig is the most decorated British Columbia school player who has competed at NCAA Division 1 level and professionally in Europe.

Career
Playing for the Brookswood Bobcats in Surrey, British Columbia, Konig won three provincial championships and was named MVP in each season. Upon graduating, she was recruited to the NC State Wolfpack, where she played four ACC seasons. With the Wolfpack she reached the third round of the NCAA Division I women's basketball tournament as a sophomore and junior, the same year she also set an ACC record for most three-pointers in a season. In her senior year she won the ACC Tournament with the Wolfpack and was named the tournament MVP and to the All-ACC Second Team. She ended her NC State career as the program's all-time leading three-point shooter and graduated with a degree in Business Administration.

Konig turned professional in 2020, signing with BC Castors Braine in Belgium. The following season she competed with Swiss team Elfic Fribourg, for whom she was the leading scorer in the team's perfect season. Following that, she joined the Washington Mystics' training camp before siging with Flammes Carolo in France for the 2022-23 season.

National Team Career
Konig made her international debut at age fourteen, first competing for Canada at the Under-16 and Under-18 teams in FIBA Americas tournaments. She was part of the team for the 2017 FIBA Under-19 Women's Basketball World Cup, where she helped the team medal for the first time in their history as well as setting a record for most threes in a single game, with ten against Latvia. She made her senior team debut at the 2019 Pan-American Games and was later called up for the 2021 FIBA Women's AmeriCup and 2022 FIBA Women's Basketball World Cup, where Canada finished fourth both times.

References

External Links
| Official Website
| NC State Profile
| FIBA Profile

1998 births
Living people
Basketball people from British Columbia
NC State Wolfpack women's basketball players
Guards (basketball)
Canadian women's basketball players
Canadian expatriate basketball people in Belgium
Canadian expatriate basketball people in Switzerland
Canadian people of Austrian descent